The Broken Wing is a 1923 American silent aviation comedy drama film directed by Tom Forman based on the play The Broken Wing by Paul Dickey and Charles W. Goddard. The film stars Kenneth Harlan, Miriam Cooper, and Walter Long. The Broken Wing was released on August 19, 1923..

Plot
In a small Mexican town near the U.S. border during the Mexican Revolution, Captain Innocencio Dos Santos (Walter Long) rules the town with an iron fist. He pursues the beautiful Inez Villera (Miriam Cooper), claiming she is his "true love". When Philip "Phil" Marvin (Kenneth Harlan), an American pilot flying in Mexico is caught in stormy weather and crash-lands on a nearby ranch, Inez nurses him back to health. Phil falls in love with his nurse but he has lost his memory.

Inez had been praying for a husband and believes he will come "in a storm". She is sure that God has answered her prayers by sending him this handsome pilot. Innocencio does not like that he has a rival and arrests the pilot and threatens to kill him, before Inez intercedes. Luther Farley (Ferdinand Munier), a local guerrilla leader, also complicates matters. Phil finally recovers his memory, repairs his aircraft and flies away with Inez. The U.S. Secret Service apprehends Dos Santos.

Cast

 Kenneth Harlan as Philip Marvin
 Miriam Cooper as Inez Villera
 Walter Long as Capt. Innocencio Dos Santos
 Miss DuPont as Celia
 Richard Tucker as Sylvester Cross
 Ed Brady as Bassilio (as Edwin J. Brady)
 Ferdinand Munier as Luther Farley
 Evelyn Selbie as Quichita

Production
The play "The Broken Wing" opened at the 48th Street Theater in New York City on November 29, 1920, and ran for 171 performances.

Principal photography on The Broken Wing took place in Detroit and Truckee, California. While in production, cinematographer Harry Perry devised a camera mount that allowed him to film from a Curtiss JN-4 biplane. Using a camera mounted on the fuselage behind the rear cockpit, Perry was able to shoot the pilot in the front cockpit.

Reception
Aviation film historian Stephen Pendo in Aviation in the Cinema (1985), considered The Broken Wing  part of the theme of "Trouble in the air" that either involves passengers and crew in an emergency or the problems faced by survivors of an air-crash. In the case of The Broken Wing, the film "combined aviation comedy with the air-crash device in telling of a flier who crashes in Mexico and is nursed by Inez (Miriam Cooper)." Aviation film historian James M. Farmer in Celluloid Wings: The Impact of Movies on Aviation (1984), noted that the later 1932 film was a remake of the 1923 production. He also stated, "Little air action in either production."

Preservation
With no copies of The Broken Wing in any film archives, it is a lost film.

References

Notes

Citations

Bibliography

 Farmer, James H. Celluloid Wings: The Impact of Movies on Aviation. Blue Ridge Summit, Pennsylvania: Tab Books Inc., 1984. .
 Pendo, Stephen. Aviation in the Cinema. Lanham, Maryland: Scarecrow Press, 1985. .
 Wynne, H. Hugh. The Motion Picture Stunt Pilots and Hollywood's Classic Aviation Movies. Missoula, Montana: Pictorial Histories Publishing Co., 1987. .

External links

 
 

1923 films
American aviation films
1923 comedy-drama films
American black-and-white films
Films shot in California
Films shot in Detroit
Mexican Revolution films
Films about the United States Secret Service
Films about amnesia
Films about aviation accidents or incidents
Films about aviators
Preferred Pictures films
1920s English-language films
1920s American films
Silent American comedy-drama films